Isabel Huntington (born 25 February 1999) is an Australian rules footballer playing for Greater Western Sydney in the AFL Women's (AFLW). She was drafted to the Western Bulldogs with the first pick in the 2017 AFL Women's draft.

Early life and junior football
Huntington was an exceptional junior footballer, impressing particularly at the 2016 AFL Youth Girls National Championships. In one match she kicked five goals (including four in one quarter) and recorded 30 disposals, all in a shortened match of 12-minute quarters.

Huntington endured injury plagued teenage years, suffering a broken leg in 2015 and a ruptured anterior cruciate ligament in her knee in 2016 that saw her miss the entirety of the 2017 junior and state-league football season. Despite not being able to play with the side due to the injury she trained in a limited capacity that year with Melbourne University who play in the VFL Women's competition. 

Huntington completed high school at St Michael's Grammar School in St Kilda in Melbourne's south. She was school captain there in her final year in 2017 and graduated with an ATAR of 98.10 that placed her in the top two per cent of students in the country. She has aspirations to study medicine and work as a doctor.

AFL Women's career
Huntington was drafted by the Western Bulldogs with the first overall selection in the 2017 AFL Women's draft.

2018 season: Debut
Soon after though she was involved in a loose-ball chase that saw her sustain a serious knee injury and sit out the remainder of the match. Scans later confirmed she had sustained a season ending ruptured anterior cruciate ligament.

2019 season: Injury
Huntington suffered a sprain to her reconstructed knee in mid-December 2018, the result of which kept her out of playing for the team until round 5 of the 2019 AFL Women's season.

2020 season: Rising Star
The 2020 AFL Women's season was a successful one for Huntington, winning many accolades and rapidly improving as she switched to the Bulldogs' back line. In that game, she collected 15 disposals, 7 marks, which was her career record at that point, and 4 tackles. She finished the season as the Bulldogs' leading mark taker, with a total of 24 over her 5 games that season. She also finished equal 1st in the league for contested marks and 2nd for intercept marks. She won the prestigious AFL Women's Rising Star award at the conclusion of the season, receiving a total of 34 votes, 4 ahead of second-placed Caitlin Greiser. The win made her the Bulldogs' first ever Rising Star winner. She also won her maiden All-Australian blazer, being placed on the half back line. She also won the team's best and fairest award,, with a total of 44 votes, 3 ahead of second-placed Ellie Blackburn.

2021 season: Forward switch
It was revealed that Huntington had signed a contract extension with the club on 16 June 2021, after playing every game possible for the club that season. Huntington achieved selection in Champion Data's 2021 AFLW All-Star stats team, after leading the league for average contested marks in the 2021 AFL Women's season, totalling 2.3 a game.

2022 season: Injury and leaving Western Bulldogs
In the first round of the 2022 AFL Women's season, Huntington suffered an anterior cruciate ligament injury, and at the end of the season was traded to Greater Western Sydney in exchange for two draft picks.

Personal life
Huntington is a cousin of Essendon AFL player Will Setterfield. She studied a Bachelor of Science at the University of Melbourne.

Statistics
Statistics are correct to the end of the 2021 season.

|- style="background-color: #eaeaea"
| scope=row style="text-align:center" | 2018 || 
| 9 || 2 || 2 || 0 || 11 || 3 || 14 || 8 || 2 || 1.0 || 0.0 || 5.5 || 1.5 || 7.0 || 4.0 || 1.0 || 0
|- 
! scope="row" style="text-align:center" | 2019
|style="text-align:center;"|
| 4 || 3 || 2 || 1 || 10 || 6 || 16 || 7 || 7 || 0.7 || 0.3 || 3.3 || 2.0 || 5.3 || 2.3 || 2.3 || 0
|- style="background-color: #eaeaea"
! scope="row" style="text-align:center" | 2020
|style="text-align:center;"|
| 4 || 5 || 1 || 1 || 49 || 16 || 65 || 24 || 13 || 0.2 || 0.2 || 9.8 || 3.2 || 13.0 || 4.8 || 2.6 || 0
|- 
! scope="row" style="text-align:center" | 2021
|style="text-align:center;"|
| 4 || 9 || 12 || 9 || 52 || 27 || 79 || 40 || 6 || 1.3 || 1.0 || 5.8 || 3.0 || 8.8 || 4.4 || 0.7 || 2
|- class="sortbottom"
! colspan=3| Career
! 19
! 17
! 11
! 122
! 52
! 174
! 79
! 28
! 0.9
! 0.6
! 6.4
! 2.7
! 9.2
! 4.2
! 1.5
! 2
|}

References

External links 

1999 births
Living people
Western Bulldogs (AFLW) players
Australian rules footballers from Victoria (Australia)
Melbourne University Football Club (VFLW) players
University of Melbourne alumni sportspeople
People educated at St Michael's Grammar School